Panaspis burgeoni is a species of lidless skink, a lizard in the family Scincidae. The species is endemic to the Democratic Republic of the Congo.

Etymology
The specific name, burgeoni, is in honor of Belgian entomologist Louis Burgeon.

Geographic range
Within the Democratic Republic of the Congo, P. burgeoni is found in foothills east of the Ruwenzori Mountains.

Habitat

Behavior
P. burgeoni is terrestrial, living in the leaf litter of the forest.

Reproduction
P. burgeoni is oviparous.

References

Further reading
de Witte G-F (1933). "Batraciens et reptiles recueillis par M[onsieur]. L. Burgeon au Ruwenzori, au Kivu et au Tanganika". Revue de zoologie et de botanique africaines 24: 111–123. (Lygosoma burgeoni, new species, p. 116). (in French).
Welch KRG (1982). Herpetology of Africa: A Checklist and Bibliography of the Orders Amphisbaenia, Sauria, and Serpentes. Malabar, Florida: Krieger Publishing Company. 293 pp. . (Panaspis burgeoni, new combination, p. 89).

Panaspis
Reptiles described in 1933
Reptiles of the Democratic Republic of the Congo
Endemic fauna of the Democratic Republic of the Congo
Taxa named by Gaston-François de Witte